Conquest of Ireland may refer to:

 Norman invasion of Ireland
 Expugnatio Hibernia (Conquest of Ireland), a contemporary account of the invasion by Gerald of Wales
 The Song of Dermot and the Earl, also called the Conquest of Ireland, a 13th-century account of the invasion by an anonymous author
 Tudor conquest of Ireland
 Cromwellian conquest of Ireland